Mette Kierkgaard (born 5 March 1972) is a Danish politician of the Moderates. She was elected member of the Folketing from the constituency of South Jutland in 2022. She has served as Minister for the Elderly from December 2022.

Personal life 
Kierkgaard was born in Ribe to Ove Tobiasen and Kirsten Nordahl. She is married to Thomas Kierkgaard.

References

1972 births
Living people
People from Ribe
Moderates (Denmark) politicians
21st-century Danish women politicians
Women government ministers of Denmark
Women members of the Folketing
20th-century Danish women
Members of the Folketing 2022–2026